is a railway station located in the city of Tsugaru, Aomori Prefecture, Japan, operated by the East Japan Railway Company (JR East).

Lines

Station layout
Nakata  Station has one side platform serving a single bi-directional track. There is no station building, only a small weather shelter on the platform. The station is unattended.

History
Nakata Station was opened on November 11, 1956 as a Japanese National Railways station in the former village of Morita, Nishitsugaru District. With the privatization of JNR on April 1, 1987, the station came under the operational control of JR East.

Surrounding area
The station is surrounded by rice fields, and Mount Iwaki is clearly visible from the platform.

See also 
 List of railway stations in Japan

References

External links

   

Stations of East Japan Railway Company
Railway stations in Aomori Prefecture
Gonō Line
Tsugaru, Aomori
Railway stations in Japan opened in 1956